The Hotel Riceland is listed on the National Register of Historic Places, and is located on the southwest corner of 3rd Street and South Main Street in downtown Stuttgart, Arkansas.

Construction began in 1919, with the grand opening in 1923.  The hotel closed in 1970.  The luxurious five-story hotel was designed by George R. Mann complete with rooftop garden.  It is the largest commercial building in Stuttgart.

Duckhunters would flock to the hotel in winter for the annual shoot.  Notable guests of the hotel included Ernest Hemingway and Clark Gable.

References

Hotel buildings on the National Register of Historic Places in Arkansas
Neoclassical architecture in Arkansas
Hotel buildings completed in 1919
National Register of Historic Places in Arkansas County, Arkansas
Historic district contributing properties in Arkansas
1919 establishments in Arkansas
Stuttgart, Arkansas